Maroko may refer to:

Maroko, Lagos State, a neighborhood in Lagos, Nigeria
Maroko, an alternative name for Morocco
Maroko (film), a 1990 anime film directed by Mamoru Oshii